Double Bang is an American dramatic film starring William Baldwin, Jon Seda, Adam Baldwin and written and directed by Heywood Gould.

Plot
A policeman's corrupt partner is killed by a hit man. The policeman gets involved with the criminal gang responsible for the killing in order to seek revenge and to 'bring down' the gang's boss.

Production
In July 1998, it was announced Norah Films’ producer Roee Sharon and writer/director Heywood Gould of Tolmitch Prods. had partnered to form Tolmitch/Norah Films to co-produce a slate of films budgeted under $10 million. The company’s first announced project was an adaptation of Gould’s 1988 novel Double Bang about an honest cop who reluctantly enters the world of corruption and murder when his partner is killed by a small-time mobster.

References

External links 

https://www.dvdverdict.com/reviews/doublebang.php
https://www.dvdtalk.com/reviews/3676/double-bang/
https://www.variety.com/profiles/TVMOW/main/26214/Double%20Bang.html?dataSet=1

Films directed by Heywood Gould
Artisan Entertainment films
2001 drama films
2001 films
American drama films
2000s English-language films
2000s American films